Saffet Sancaklı (born 27 February 1966) is a Turkish former international footballer  and current politician. He is a deputy of Nationalist Movement Party, representing city of Kocaeli.

Club career
Sancaklı scored 130 goals in Süper Lig with different teams. He is third player (after Refik Osman Top and Ali Soydan) who played at the Big Three of Turkey, Beşiktaş (1987–1988), Galatasaray (1994–1995) and Fenerbahçe (1996–1998). He also played for Kültürspor (1983–1985), Vefa SK (1985–1987), Eskişehirspor (1988–1989, on loan), Sarıyer (1990–1991), Kocaelispor (1991–1994 and 1995–1996) and Konyaspor (1989–1990, on loan and 1998–1999).

International career
Sancaklı played for Turkey national football team (23 matches with 6 goals) and was a participant at the 1996 UEFA European Championship.

Post football career
After retiring football, he went into politics from Nationalist Movement Party. He ran for deputyship from İstanbul in Turkish general elections in 2011 and ran for mayor of Kocaeli metropolitan municipality in Turkish local elections in 2014, but was successful in neither. He was finally elected as deputy from Kocaeli in the Turkish general elections of June 2015, and reelected in the November 2015 Turkish general election.

References

External links
 Sancaklı Management

http://www.tff.org/Default.aspx?pageId=526&kisiId=22020

1966 births
Living people
People from Tutin, Serbia
Bosniaks of Serbia
Turkish footballers
Turkey international footballers
Serbian emigrants to Turkey
Turkish people of Serbian descent
Turkish people of Bosniak descent
Association football forwards
UEFA Euro 1996 players
Vefa S.K. footballers
Fenerbahçe S.K. footballers
Kocaelispor footballers
Galatasaray S.K. footballers
Beşiktaş J.K. footballers
Konyaspor footballers
Sarıyer S.K. footballers
Süper Lig players
Turkish sportsperson-politicians
Members of the 25th Parliament of Turkey
Members of the 26th Parliament of Turkey